Radio Caribbean International (RCI) is a radio station located in Castries, Saint Lucia. The station was established in 1961 and is thus the oldest radio station in Saint Lucia. RCI was originally owned by French-based Sofirad and was a part of Radio Caraïbes International, Martinique/Guadeloupe. Now, RCI in St. Lucia is locally owned.

External links
Official page

Radio stations in Saint Lucia
Radio stations established in 1961